Lerstad is a Norwegian surname. Notable people with the surname include:

 Terje Bjørn Lerstad (born 1955), Norwegian composer and clarinetist
 Tonje Haug Lerstad (born 1996), Norwegian handball player

Norwegian-language surnames